In radiology, the silhouette sign refers to the loss of normal borders between thoracic structures. It is usually caused by an intrathoracic radiopaque mass that touches the border of the heart or aorta. In other words, it is difficult to make out the borders of a particular structure - normal or otherwise - because it is next to another dense structure, both of which will appear white on a standard X-ray. It may occur, for example, in right middle lobe syndrome, where the right heart margin is obscured, and in right lower lobe pneumonia, where the border of the diaphragm on the right side is obscured, while the right heart margin remains distinct.
Silhouette sign is very useful in localizing lung lesions as all structures forming cardiac silhouette are in contact with a specific portion of the lung.

References

Further reading
The Silhouette Sign Revisited, Vernon J. Louw, Adrian Schmidt, Chris T. Bolliger. Lung Unit, Department of Internal Medicine, Tygerberg Hospital, Cape  Town, South Africa.

Radiologic signs